Rick Vincent is an American country music artist. Signed to Curb Records in 1992, Vincent released his debut album, A Wanted Man, the following year, and charted two singles on the Billboard Hot Country Singles & Tracks (now Hot Country Songs) charts. The album and its two singles remain Vincent's only contributions as a recording artist.

Vincent moved to Nashville, Tennessee in 1989 to pursue his musical career. After songwriter and producer Wendy Waldman discovered one of his demo tapes, he signed to Curb Records in 1992. His lone Curb album, A Wanted Man, charted two singles: "The Best Mistakes I Ever Made" and "Ain't Been a Train Through Here in Years". The album received a positive review from Brian Mansfield of Allmusic, who said that Vincent "writes thoughtful and literate lyrics" while praising Vincent's singing voice. Similarly, a review in the Pittsburgh Post-Gazette praised Vincent's lyricism and influence from the Bakersfield sound, while also noting his "strong, rich baritone". A third single from the album, "Hello, She Lied", did not make the charts, and Vincent never recorded again. However, he co-wrote the song "Heartbroke Every Day", a top 20 hit on the country charts for Lonestar in 1996.

Discography

A Wanted Man (1993)

Track listing
"The Best Mistakes I Ever Made" (Vincent) – 3:01
"Hello, She Lied" (Vincent, Will Jennings) – 2:54
"When the Smoke Clears" (Vincent, Brad Parker) – 3:45
"Ain't Been a Train Through Here in Years" (Vincent, Steve Hill) – 3:17
"You're Not in This Alone" (Vincent, Tim Lancaster) – 2:30
"Outlaw Heart" (Vincent, Kevin Ball) – 3:30
"A Wanted Man" (Vincent, Rick West, Bill Shore) – 2:47
"Cottonwood Creek" (Vincent) – 2:48
"'Round the Honky Tonk Bend" (Vincent, Ball) – 4:17
"San Joaquin" (Vincent) – 4:19

Personnel
From A Wanted Man liner notes.
Musicians
Eddie Bayers – drums
Karla Bonoff – background vocals
Sam Bush – mandolin
Jerry Douglas – Dobro
Dan Dugmore – steel guitar
Kenny Edwards – mandolin, background vocals
Steve Gibson – electric guitar, acoustic guitar, mandolin
Andrew Gold – background vocals
Rob Hajacos – fiddle
Sid Page – fiddle
Brad Parker – electric guitar
Gary Prim – piano
Michael Rhodes – bass guitar
Brent Rowan – electric guitar
Rick Vincent – acoustic guitar, lead and background vocals
Wendy Waldman – acoustic guitar, background vocals
Willie Weeks – bass guitar
Technical
Steve Hall – mastering
Brad Parker – assistant producer
Dennis Ritchie – recording, mixing
Wendy Waldman – producer

Singles

Music videos

References

American country singer-songwriters
Singer-songwriters from California
Living people
Year of birth missing (living people)
Curb Records artists
20th-century American singers
Country musicians from California
American male singer-songwriters
20th-century American male singers